The Standard Industrial Classification (SIC) was a system for classifying industries by a four-digit code as a method of standardizing industry classification for statistical purposes across agencies. Established in the United States in 1937, it is used by government agencies to classify industry areas. Similar SIC systems are also used by agencies in other countries, e.g., by the United Kingdom's Companies House.

In the United States, the SIC system was last revised in 1987 and was last used by the Census Bureau for the 1992 Economic Census, and has been replaced by the North American Industry Classification System (NAICS code), which was released in 1997. Some U.S. government departments and agencies, such as the U.S. Securities and Exchange Commission (SEC), continued to use SIC codes through at least 2019.

The SIC code for an establishment, that is, a unique business with a registered U.S. headquarters, was determined by the industry appropriate for the overall largest product lines of the company or organization of which the establishment was a part.  The later NAICS classification system has a different concept, assigning establishments into categories based on each one's output.

History
The Standard Industrial Classification (SIC) code system has been used since the 1930s. It was developed by the Interdepartmental Committee on Industrial Statistics, established by the Central Statistical Board who developed the List of Industries for manufacturing, published in 1938, and the 1939 List of Industries for non-manufacturing industries, which became the first Standard Industrial Classification for the United States. The SIC system was last revised in 1987 and was last used by the Census Bureau for the 1992 Economic Census.

The Office of Management and Budget, or OMB, was tasked with revising the SIC system to reflect changing economic conditions. The OMB established the Economic Classification Policy Committee in 1992 to develop a new system representative of the current industrial climate. The result was the North American Industry Classification System, or NAICS, a collaborative effort between Canada, the U.S. and Mexico. NAICS replaced the four-digit SIC code with a six-digit code, and it provided more flexibility in handling emerging industries (for example, the NAICS system more generally allows for "Other..." categories across industry groups). The new codes were implemented in Canada and the United States in 1997 and in Mexico one year later.

NAICS classified establishments (workplace) by their main output, instead of classifying them with the larger firm or organization of which the establishment was a part. This gives more precise information on establishment and worker activities than the SIC system, but changed the meaning of the classifications somewhat, making some time series of data hard to sustain accurately.  Fort and Klimek (2016) found using longitudinal data on establishments that the switch from SIC to NAICS reclassified large numbers of workers differently by industry/sector than NAICS does, notably by reclassifying some from the Manufacturing sector into Services.

Purpose
In the early 1900s, each branch of a United States government agency would conduct business analysis using its own methods and metrics, unknown and meaningless to other branches. In the 1930s, the government needed standardized and meaningful ways in which to measure, analyze and share data across its various agencies. Thus, the Standard Industrial Classification system was born. SIC codes are four-digit numerical representations of major businesses and industries. SIC codes are assigned based on common characteristics shared in the products, services, production and delivery system of a business.

Structure 
SIC codes have a hierarchical, top-down structure that begins with general characteristics and narrows down to the specifics. The first two digits of the code represent the major industry sector to which a business belongs. The third and fourth digits describe the sub-classification of the business group and specialization, respectively. For example, "36" refers to a business that deals in "Electronic and Other Equipment." Adding "7" as a third digit to get "367" indicates that the business operates in "Electronic, Component and Accessories." The fourth digit distinguishes the specific industry sector, so a code of "3672" indicates that the business is concerned with "Printed Circuit Boards."

Uses
The U.S. Census Bureau, Bureau of Labor Statistics, Internal Revenue Service and Social Security Administration utilize SIC codes in their reporting, although SIC codes are also used in academic and business sectors. The Bureau of Labor Statistics updates the codes every three years and uses SIC to report on work force, wages and pricing issues. The Social Security Administration assigns SIC codes to businesses based on the descriptions provided by employers under the primary business activity entry on employer ID applications.

Limitations
Over the years, the U.S. Census has identified three major limitations to using the SIC system. The first limitation surrounds its definition and mistaken classification of employee groups. For example, administrative assistants in the automotive industry support all levels of the business, yet the SIC defines these employees as part of the "Basic Sector" of manufacturing jobs when they should be reported as "Non-Basic." Secondly, SIC codes were developed for traditional industries prior to 1970. Business has changed considerably since then from manufacturing-based to mostly service-based. As a result, and thirdly the SIC has been slow to recognize new and emerging industries, such as those in the computer, software, and information technology sectors.

Codes

Range
The SIC codes can be grouped into progressively broader industry classifications: industry group, major group, and division. The first 3 digits of the SIC code indicate the industry group, and the first two digits indicate the major group. Each division encompasses a range of SIC codes:

To look at a particular example of the hierarchy, SIC code 2024 (ice cream and frozen desserts) belongs to industry group 202 (dairy products), which is part of major group 20 (food and kindred products), which belongs to the division of manufacturing.

List
The following table is from the SEC's website, which allows searching for companies by SIC code in its database of filings. The acronym NEC stands for "not elsewhere classified".

See also
 International Standard Industrial Classification
 Global Industry Classification Standard
 Australian and New Zealand Standard Industrial Classification
 United Kingdom Standard Industrial Classification of Economic Activities
 Industry Classification Benchmark
 Merchant category code

References

External links
 
 Bernard Guibert, Jean Laganier and Michel Volle, An Essay on Industrial Classifications, Économie et statistique n° 20, February 1971
 North American Industry Classification System
 SIC Tools and Resources

1937 establishments in the United States
Industry classifications